Paris Cafe may refer to:

 Parisian café, cafés in Paris
 South Street Seaport, a bar in New York

See also
 Café de Paris